A list of films produced by the Ollywood film industry based in Bhubaneswar and Cuttack in the 2010s:

References

2010s
Ollywood
Films, Ollywood